Clitherall is a city in Otter Tail County, Minnesota, United States. The population was 62 at the 2020 census.

Geography

Minnesota State Highway 210 serves as a main route in the community.

History
Clitherall was platted in 1881 and named for nearby Clitherall Lake, which was named for slaveowner and presidential appointee George B. Clitherall.

In 1953, Clyde Fletcher founded the Mormon sect the True Church of Jesus Christ in Clitherall. With fewer than 10 members, the church became defunct upon Fletcher's death in 1969.

Demographics

2010 census
As of the census of 2010, there were 112 people, 52 households, and 30 families living in the city. The racial makeup of the city was 98.2% White, 0.9% African American, and 0.9% from two or more races.

There were 52 households, of which 25.0% had children under the age of 18 living with them, 40.4% were married couples living together, 9.6% had a female householder with no husband present, 7.7% had a male householder with no wife present, and 42.3% were non-families. 36.5% of all households were made up of individuals, and 15.4% had someone living alone who was 65 years of age or older. The average household size was 2.04 and the average family size was 2.60.

The median age in the city was 50.5 years. 20.5% of residents were under the age of 18; 4.6% were between the ages of 18 and 24; 19.8% were from 25 to 44; 28.6% were from 45 to 64; and 26.8% were 65 years of age or older. The gender makeup of the city was 50.0% male and 50.0% female.

2000 census
As of the census of 2000, there were 118 people, 51 households, and 32 families living in the city. The racial makeup of the city was 94.92% White, 4.24% Native American, and 0.85% from two or more races.

There were 51 households, out of which 23.5% had children under the age of 18 living with them, 58.8% were married couples living together, 2.0% had a female householder with no husband present, and 35.3% were non-families. 29.4% of all households were made up of individuals, and 15.7% had someone living alone who was 65 years of age or older. The average household size was 2.31 and the average family size was 2.91.

In the city, the population was spread out, with 23.7% under the age of 18, 8.5% from 18 to 24, 24.6% from 25 to 44, 22.0% from 45 to 64, and 21.2% who were 65 years of age or older. The median age was 38 years. For every 100 females, there were 107.0 males. For every 100 females age 18 and over, there were 104.5 males.

The median income for a household in the city was $26,667, and the median income for a family was $30,625. Males had a median income of $25,625 versus $17,813 for females. The per capita income for the city was $15,113. There were 6.5% of families and 10.0% of the population living below the poverty line, including no under eighteens and 9.1% of those over 64.

References

External links

Cities in Minnesota
Cities in Otter Tail County, Minnesota
Populated places established in 1864